Yoo Jae-myung (born June 3, 1973) is a South Korean actor. He is best known for his roles in the series Reply 1988 (2015), Stranger (2017), Life (2018), Itaewon Class (2020) and Voice of Silence (2020). He won Best Supporting Actor at the 6th APAN Star Awards.

Career
Making his debut through the film The Last Witness in 2001, Yoo Jae-myung mainly took the supporting roles in movies and dramas. He was also a theater director in Busan and taught acting for four years in Seoul.

Yoo's popularity raised through one of the highest rated dramas in Korean cable television history, Reply 1988, in 2015, and later gained the main roles in films and TV series. From 2016 to 2018, he appeared in critically acclaimed shows such as The Good Wife, Stranger (Secret Forest), and Prison Playbook.

Yoo then appeared in two television series Life and Confession in 2018 and 2019 respectively, in which he received positive reviews from audiences. For his performance in Life, he won Best Supporting Actor award at the 6th APAN Star Awards.

Yoo next co-starred with Lee Sung-min in crime film The Beast, a remake of the French thriller 36 Quai des Orfèvres, premiered in June 2019. He also starred alongside Lee Young-ae in Bring Me Home, which was premiered in November 2019.

In 2020, Yoo co-starred with Park Seo-joon and Kim Da-mi in the series Itaewon Class, He next starred opposite Yoo Ah-in in a film Voice of Silence, written and directed by a female director Hong Eui-jeong, based on her script which was selected as one of top 12 projects at Venice Biennale College-Cinema 2016/2017.

Yoo's next projects will be King Maker with Sul Kyung-gu and Kwak Kyung-taek's Firefighters.

Personal life
Yoo married on October 21, 2018 after dating for five years. He had met his wife who is reportedly twelve years younger while directing a stage play. The couple has one child together.

Filmography

Film

Television series

Web series

Awards and nominations

References

External links
 

1973 births
Living people
South Korean male film actors
South Korean male television actors
Pusan National University alumni
Male actors from Busan
21st-century South Korean male actors